Philippians 4 is the fourth and final chapter of the Epistle to the Philippians in the New Testament of the Christian Bible. It is authored by Paul the Apostle about mid-50s to early 60s AD and addressed to the Christians in Philippi. This chapter contains Paul's final exhortation, thanks for support and conclusion of the epistle.

Text
The original text was written in Koine Greek. This chapter is divided into 23 verses.

Textual witnesses
Some early manuscripts containing the text of this chapter are:

Papyrus 16 (3rd century; extant verses 2–8)
Codex Vaticanus (325–350)
Codex Sinaiticus (330–360)
Codex Alexandrinus (400–440)
Codex Freerianus (~450; extant verses 3–6, 13–15)
Codex Claromontanus (~550)

Citizens of earth and heaven (3:17–4:1)
Translator J. B. Phillips, commentator Robert Murray, the New Revised Standard Version and the Jerusalem Bible connect verse 1 with the final section of the previous chapter, as the conclusion of Paul's main exhortations in chapters 2–3. Commentator Joseph Benson says "certainly it should not have been separated" from chapter 3.

Verse 1
Therefore, my beloved and longed-for brethren, my joy and crown, so stand fast in the Lord, beloved.

This verse is "overflows with words of love and joy", with the word 'beloved' (epipothetoi) "echoes Epaphroditus' yearning" in chapter 2.

Last Appeal for Harmony (4:2–3)
Paul asks the two diakonoi, Euodia and Syntyche, female leaders of different house-groups in Philippi, "to be of the same mind" (to think, phronein, "the same").

Verse 3
And I urge you also, true companion, help these women who laboured with me in the gospel, with Clement also, and the rest of my fellow workers, whose names are in the Book of Life.
Paul addresses one of the leaders responsible for the church. Benson suggests he is probably addressing Silas, "for Silas had been his yoke-fellow at the very place".

Last Call to Joy, Peace, and Right Thinking in Christ (4:4–9)
According to Paul, the cure of the troubles in the church is to recall "the charismatic joy of their first coming to faith", just as he told the Thessalonian church that "in spite of persecutions you received the word with joy inspired by the Holy Spirit".

Verse 4
Rejoice in the Lord always. Again I will say, rejoice!

 "[and] again, I say, rejoice": Paul continues to suggest this, because it is very important for the comfort of believers, and the honor of Christ.

Verse 6
Be anxious for nothing, but in everything by prayer and supplication, with thanksgiving, let your requests be made known to God;

Verse 7
and the peace of God, which surpasses all understanding, will guard your hearts and minds through Christ Jesus.

Paul's Attitude to Gifts Received and Last Greetings (4:10–23)
Paul acknowledges the support from the church in Philippi, describing it as "a sacrifice pleasing to God", and prays that God will take care of their needs, before closing the epistle with a mention of "Caesar's household" ("emperor's household") in verse 22, probably as a hint (cf. ) of the success Paul in obtaining Praetorian contacts.

Verse 13
 I can do all things through Christ who strengthens me.
"Christ": the name (in Greek: , Christō) is found in the majority of textual witnesses (א2 D2 [F G] Ψ 075 1175 1241 1505 1881 2464 M al sy Hier), but other excellent textual witnesses lack explicit reference, so rendered as "him" (א* A B D* I 33 1739 lat co Cl).

See also

 Jesus Christ
 Macedonia
 Thessalonica
 Related Bible parts: Romans 8, Hebrews 4

References

Citations

Works cited

General sources

External links

 English translation with parallel Latin Vulgate
 Online Bible at GospelHall.org (ESV, KJV, Darby, American Standard Version, Bible in Basic English)
 Multiple bible versions of Philippians 4 (NKJV, NIV, NRSV etc.) at Bible Gateway

04